Macbeth is a 1948 American historical drama directed by Orson Welles. A film adaptation of William Shakespeare's tragedy of the same name, it tells the story of the Scottish general who becomes the King of Scotland through treachery and murder. The film stars Welles in the lead role and Jeanette Nolan (in her feature film debut) as Lady Macbeth.

Plot
In the Middle Ages, Macbeth and Banquo are approached by the Three Witches. They address Macbeth, hailing him as the "Thane of Cawdor" and the future king of Scotland. King Duncan's men arrive and congratulate Macbeth of his victory, awarding him the title of Thane of Cawdor. Macbeth sends a letter to his wife about the Three Witches' prophecy, in which she questions whether Macbeth is capable of murdering Duncan. 

Duncan welcomes and praises Macbeth, declaring he will spend the night at Macbeth's castle. Later that night, Macbeth expresses discomfort with killing Duncan. Lady Macbeth overrides her husband's objections by challenging his manhood and persuades him to kill Duncan. Offscreen, Macbeth murders Duncan but returns back to his wife with the daggers. When Duncan is found dead, Macbeth frames Duncan's two servants by placing the bloody daggers on them. Remembering the prophecy, Banquo is suspicious of Macbeth's potential role in murdering Duncan. Returning to his wife, Macbeth expresses his guilt and he proclaims he will never be able to sleep again. 

Duncan's sons Malcolm and Donalbain have fled, in which Macbeth is crowned the new king of Scotland. Worried that Banquo's descendants would rule Scotland, Macbeth invites Banquo to a royal banquet. He sends two men to successfully murder Banquo, but his son Fleance escapes. At the banquet, Macbeth becomes haunted after seeing Banquo's ghost. The others panic at Macbeth raging at an empty chair, until a desperate Lady Macbeth tells them that her husband is merely afflicted with a harmless malady. 

Enraged, Macbeth is warned by the Three Witches to beware of Macduff, who has fled to England. Macbeth frames Macduff as a traitor and sends soldiers to kill him. When the soldiers arrive at Macduff's castle, everyone is put to death, including Lady Macduff and their young son. Back in England, Ross informs Macduff that his family has been killed, to which Macduff swears revenge. Together, with Malcolm and Donalbain, they return to Scotland with a massive army to wage war against Macbeth. 

Back in Scotland, Macbeth learns of the approaching English army and has a doctor tend to Lady Macbeth, who is suffering from hallucinations. Wracked with guilt over the murders, Lady Macbeth sleepwalks throughout the castle and falls over a steep cliff to her death. Shortly after, the English army invade, covering themselves by cutting down tree branches. They storm the castle, where Macduff battles Macbeth in a sword fight. Macduff beheads Macbeth, and Ross presents the crown to Malcolm.

Production
In 1947, Orson Welles began promoting the notion of bringing a Shakespeare drama to the motion picture screen. He initially attempted to pique Alexander Korda's interest in an adaptation of Othello, but was unable to gather support for the project. Welles switched to pushing for a film adaptation of Macbeth, which he visualized in its violent setting as "a perfect cross between Wuthering Heights and Bride of Frankenstein."

Teaming with producer Charles K. Feldman, Welles successfully convinced Herbert Yates, founder and president of Republic Pictures, of the prospect of creating a film version of Macbeth. Yates was attempting to raise the level of his studio, which produced Roy Rogers Westerns and low-budget features, into that of a prestige studio. Republic had already tried to present off-beat features, including Gustav Machatý's Jealousy (1945) and Ben Hecht's Specter of the Rose (1946).

However, Yates was not able to provide Welles with a large budget. Welles guaranteed to deliver a completed negative of Macbeth on a budget of $700,000. When some members of the Republic board of directors expressed misgivings on the project, Welles had a contract drawn in which he agreed to personally pay any amount over $700,000.

Welles had previously staged the so-called Voodoo Macbeth in 1936 in New York City with an all-black cast, and again in 1947 in Salt Lake City as part of the Utah Centennial Festival. He borrowed aspects from both productions for his film adaptation.

Macbeth marked the fourth time that a post-silent era Hollywood studio produced a film based on a Shakespeare play: United Artists had produced The Taming of the Shrew in 1929, Warner Brothers made A Midsummer Night’s Dream in 1935, and Metro-Goldwyn-Mayer produced Romeo and Juliet in 1936. None of these films was commercially successful, but the commercial and critical prestige earned by Laurence Olivier's film version of Henry V (which was produced in Great Britain in 1944 but not seen in the U.S. until 1946) helped to propel Welles' Macbeth forward.

Casting 

Welles cast himself in the title role, but was initially stymied in casting Lady Macbeth, regarded by Republic as the focus of the film. His first choice was Vivien Leigh, but Welles never approached her since he believed her husband, Laurence Olivier, would be unsupportive. The role was offered to Tallulah Bankhead, who turned it down. At Welles's request Anne Baxter, Mercedes McCambridge and Agnes Moorehead were approached but they were unavailable. "There is no evidence to suggest that these rejections were much of a blow to Welles," wrote biographer Frank Brady. Welles settled on Jeanette Nolan, one of the Mercury Theatre's repertory players on radio and a trusted colleague since their days on The March of Time radio program.

Welles brought in Irish actor Dan O'Herlihy in his first U.S. film role as Macduff, and cast former child star Roddy McDowall as Malcolm. Welles also cast his daughter Christopher in the role of Macduff's son; this was her only film appearance.

Cast

The cast of Macbeth is listed in the AFI Catalog of Feature Films.

Orson Welles as Macbeth 
Jeanette Nolan as Lady Macbeth
Dan O'Herlihy as Macduff
Roddy McDowall as Malcolm
Edgar Barrier as Banquo
Alan Napier as A Holy Father
Erskine Sanford as Duncan
John Dierkes as Ross
Keene Curtis as Lennox
Peggy Webber as Lady Macduff  and Witch
Lionel Braham as Siward
Archie Heugly as Siward
Jerry Farber as Fleance
Christopher Welles as Macduff's child
Morgan Farley as Doctor
Lurene Tuttle as Gentlewoman and Witch
Brainerd Duffield as First Murderer and Witch
William Alland as Second Murderer
George Chirello as Seyton
Gus Schilling as A porter
Robert Alan as Third Murderer (uncredited) 
Harry Wilson as Banquet Guest (uncredited)

Adaptation
In bringing Macbeth to the screen, Welles made several changes to Shakespeare's original. He added sequences involving the witches to increase their significance. At the beginning of the film, they create a clay figurine of Macbeth, which is used to symbolize his rise and ruin. It collapses in a heap, seemingly of its own volition, immediately after Macbeth is beheaded. The witches seem to cast a spell on the doll, and anything that happens to it seems to happen also to Macbeth, as in voodoo. The witches also return at the end of the film, viewing the drama from afar and uttering  "Peace, the charm's wound up" as the final line; this line is spoken in the first act in the original text, when the witches initially confront Macbeth.

Because of censorship, the Porter's speech was shorn of all its double entendre.

A major change is Welles' introduction of a new character, the Holy Man. The priest recites the prayer of Saint Michael. Welles later explained that the character's presence was meant to confirm that "the main point of that production is the struggle between the old and new religions. I saw the witches as representatives of a Druidical pagan religion suppressed by Christianity – itself a new arrival." There is a subtle insinuation that Lady Macbeth fatally stabs Duncan prior to Macbeth's attack on the king, and Macbeth is witness to Lady Macbeth's sleepwalking and madness scene; in the play, he is not present.

Other changes were made to make the play more cinematic. Nearly all of King Duncan's scenes at the beginning of the play have been cut as well as the character of Donalbain, his second son. Macbeth is seen dictating his letter to his wife, rather than writing it himself. In the play, no such dictation scene exists. The Thane of Cawdor's execution takes place on-screen accompanied by insistent drumbeats. Lady Macbeth's suicide and the final battle between Macbeth's forces and Macduff's army are depicted on-screen; in the play, both scenes occur off-stage. Rather than fatally stabbing Macbeth and then beheading the dead body, Macduff kills Macbeth by slashing off his head. Needless to say, lines have been cut, speeches have been reassigned, scenes have been reordered, etc. This scandalized many critics at the time; today it is accepted practice to do so in film versions of Shakespeare plays to an even greater degree than Welles did, as Jean-Luc Godard did in his highly unusual and controversial King Lear, and as Peter Greenaway did in Prospero's Books.

Filming
The film was shot on sets left over from the westerns that were normally made at Republic Studios. In order to accommodate the tight production schedule, Welles had the Macbeth cast pre-record their dialogue.

Welles later expressed frustration with the film's low budget trappings. Most of the costumes were rented from Western Costume, except those for Macbeth and Lady Macbeth. "Mine should have been sent back, because I looked like the Statue of Liberty in it," Welles told filmmaker Peter Bogdanovich. "But there was no dough for another and nothing in stock at Western would fit me, so I was stuck with it."

Welles also told Bogdanovich that the scene he felt was most effective was actually based on hunger. "Our best crowd scene was a shot where all the massed forces of Macduff's army are charging the castle", he said. "There was a very vivid urgency to it, because what was happening, really, was that we'd just called noon break, and all those extras were rushing off to lunch."

Welles shot Macbeth in 23 days, with one day devoted to retakes.

Release and reception
Republic initially planned to have Macbeth in release by December 1947, but Welles was not ready with the film. The studio entered the film in the 1948 Venice Film Festival, but it was abruptly withdrawn when it was compared unfavorably against Olivier's version of Hamlet, which was also in the festival's competition.

In the U.S. theatrical release, Republic tested the film in a few cities. Critical reaction was overwhelmingly negative, with complaints about Welles's decision to have his cast speak in Scottish burrs and modify the original text.

After its original release, Republic had Welles cut two reels from the film and ordered him to have much of the soundtrack re-recorded with the actors speaking in their natural voices, and not the approximation of Scottish accents that Welles initially requested. This new version was released by Republic in 1950. While critical reaction was still not supportive, the film earned a small profit for the studio.

Welles would maintain mixed emotions about Macbeth. In a 1953 lecture at the Edinburgh Fringe Festival, he said: "My purpose in making Macbeth was not to make a great film – and this is unusual, because I think that every film director, even when he is making nonsense, should have as his purpose the making of a great film. I thought I was making what might be a good film, and what, if the 23-day day shoot schedule came off, might encourage other filmmakers to tackle difficult subjects at greater speed. Unfortunately, not one critic in any part of the world chose to compliment me on the speed. They thought it was a scandal that it should only take 23 days. Of course, they were right, but I could not write to every one of them and explain that no one would give me any money for a further day's shooting . . . However, I am not ashamed of the limitations of the picture."

The truncated version of Macbeth remained in release until 1980, when the original uncut version with the Scottish-tinged soundtrack was restored by the UCLA Film and Television Archive and the Folger Shakespeare Library. On Rotten Tomatoes, the film has an approval rating of 88% based on 25 reviews, with an average rating of 7.52/10. The site's critics' consensus reads: "This haunting, eccentric Macbeth may be hampered by budget constraints, but Orson Welles delivers both behind and in front of the camera."

References

Sources

External links

 
 
 

1948 films
1940s American films
1940s English-language films
1940s historical drama films
American historical drama films
American black-and-white films
Films based on Macbeth
Films directed by Orson Welles
Films scored by Jacques Ibert
Films set in Scotland
Films with screenplays by Orson Welles
Republic Pictures films